Gordon Bell (9 January 1906 – 1979) was an English professional footballer who played as an outside left. He made appearances in the English Football League for Wrexham, Swansea Town and Carlisle United.

He was also on the books at football league teams Darlington, Durham City and Leeds United, however didn't make an appearance for any of them.

References

1906 births
1979 deaths
English footballers
Association football midfielders
English Football League players
Newcastle Swifts F.C. players
Chilton Colliery Recreation F.C. players
Darlington F.C. players
Durham City A.F.C. players
Carlisle United F.C. players
Leeds United F.C. players
Wrexham A.F.C. players
Swansea City A.F.C. players
Consett A.F.C. players